The Glass Mountain is a geologic feature in Lower Cathedral Valley of Capitol Reef National Park consisting of large selenite (gypsum) crystals forming a mound or plug 15 feet high. Gypsum was deposited as sea water evaporated 165 million years ago and then buried under other sediments. The gypsum migrated upwards through fractures in the sediments forming layers and, very rarely, domes like the Glass Mountain. There is only one exposed selenite plug within the park and one other just outside which has been reduced to ground level by collectors.

Climate
Spring and fall are the most favorable seasons to visit Glass Mountain. According to the Köppen climate classification system, it is located in a Cold semi-arid climate zone, which is defined by the coldest month having an average mean temperature below 32 °F (0 °C), and at least 50% of the total annual precipitation being received during the spring and summer.

See also

 Geology of the Capitol Reef area

External links
 Weather Forecast: Cathedral Valley
 Capitol Reef National Park National Park Service

References 

 http://geology.utah.gov/surveynotes/geosights/cathedralvalley.htm

Capitol Reef National Park
Geology of Utah